The Berkeley School of Theology (BST) is a Baptist theological institute in Berkeley, California. It is affiliated with the American Baptist Churches USA. It is part of the Graduate Theological Union, a consortium of theological schools and centers in the Berkeley area.

History 
The earliest roots of Berkeley School of Theology lie in the chartering of California College, Vacaville, in 1871. In 1887  the college moved to Oakland, and in 1912 to Berkeley, at which time it changed its name to Berkeley Baptist Divinity School (BBDS), keeping this name until 1968. In 1915, BBDS merged with the Pacific Coast Baptist Theological Seminary, which had begun in Oakland in 1890 and had moved to Berkeley in 1904. In 1968, BBDS merged with California Baptist Theological Seminary (founded in 1944 in Los Angeles, and located in Covina since 1951). To reflect the fact that the school was no longer wholly in Berkeley, it was renamed the American Baptist Seminary of the West, but six years later the Covina faculty moved to the Berkeley campus, effecting considerable cost savings and at the same time availing themselves of the resources of the Graduate Theological Union. In July 2020, ABSW changed its name again to Berkeley School of Theology.

Academics
BST offers a wide range of programs from specialized certificates, accredited Master of Divinity (M.Div.), Master of Community Leadership (MCL), a fully-online Master of Theological Studies (MTS) and Doctor of Ministry (D.Min.) degrees. Jointly with the Graduate Theological Union, BST offers an accredited Master of Arts (MA). BST also participates with the Graduate Theological Union in offering the Doctor of Philosophy (Ph.D.) degree.

References

External links
Official website 

Seminaries and theological colleges in California
Educational institutions established in 1968
Baptist Christianity in California
Graduate Theological Union
Seminaries and theological colleges affiliated with the American Baptist Churches USA